In Greek mythology, the name Clymene or Klymene (Kluménē means 'fame') may refer to:

 Clymene, the wife of the Titan Iapetus, was one of the 3,000 Oceanids, the daughters of the Titans Oceanus and his sister-spouse Tethys. She was the mother of Atlas, Epimetheus, Prometheus, and Menoetius; other authors relate the same of her sister Asia. A less common genealogy makes Clymene the mother of Deucalion by Prometheus. She may also be the Clymene referred to as the mother of Mnemosyne by Zeus. In some myths, Clymene was one of the nymphs in the train of Cyrene.

 Clymene, another Oceanid, was given as the wife to King Merops of Aethiopia and was, by Helios, the mother of Phaethon and the Heliades.

Others include:
 Clymene, the name of one or two Nereid(s), 50 sea-nymph daughters of the 'Old Man of the Sea' Nereus and the Oceanid Doris. Clymene and her other sisters appeared to Thetis when she cries out in sympathy for the grief of Achilles for his slain comrade Patroclus.
 Clymene, an Amazon.
 Clymene, an "ox-eyed" servant of Helen of Troy. She was a daughter of Aethra by Hippalces, thus half-sister to Theseus and a distant relative to Menelaus. Clymene and her mother were taken by Helen to Troy as handmaidens when Helen was carried off by Paris. Later on, she was among the captives during the Trojan War along with Aethra, Creusa, Aristomache and Xenodice. After the taking of Troy, when the booty was distributed, Clymene was given to Acamas. Meanwhile, some accounts relate that she and her mother were released by Acamas and Demophon after the fall of Troy.
 Clymene, a Cretan princess as the daughter of King Catreus, son of Minos. She and her sister Aerope were given to Nauplius to be sold away, as Catreus feared the possibility of being killed by one of his children. Nauplius took Clymene to wife, and by him she became mother of Palamedes, Oeax and Nausimedon. In some account, the possible mother of these children was either Hesione or Philyra.
 Clymene, an Orchomenian princess as the daughter of King Minyas. She was the wife of either Cephalus or Phylacus, and mother of Iphiclus and Alcimede. Some sources call her Periclymene or Eteoclymene, while according to others, Periclymene and Eteoclymene were the names of her sisters. Alternately, this Clymene was the wife of Iasus and mother by him of Atalanta. She was one of the souls encountered by Odysseus in his journey to the underworld.
 Clymene, wife of Merops of Miletus, and mother of Pandareus.
 Clymene, possible mother of Myrtilus by Hermes.
 Clymene, a nymph, mother of Tlesimenes by Parthenopaeus.
 Clymene and her husband Dictys were honored in Athens as the saviors of Perseus and had an altar dedicated to them.
Clymene, one of the daughters of King Aeolus of Lipara, the keeper of the winds. She had six brothers namely: Periphas, Agenor, Euchenor, Klymenos, Xouthos, Macareus, and five sisters: Kallithyia, Eurygone, Lysidike, Kanake and an unnamed one. According to various accounts, Aeolus yoked in marriage his sons and daughters, including Clymene, in order to preserve concord and affection among them.

Legacy 
 356217 Clymene, Jupiter trojan (asteroid), named after the daughter of Catreus, wife of Nauplius and mother of Palamedes.
 104 Klymene, Themistian asteroid

Notes

References 

 Aken, Dr. A.R.A. van. (1961). Elseviers Mythologische Encyclopedie. Amsterdam: Elsevier.
 Antoninus Liberalis, The Metamorphoses of Antoninus Liberalis translated by Francis Celoria (Routledge 1992). Online version at the Topos Text Project.
 Apollodorus, The Library with an English Translation by Sir James George Frazer, F.B.A., F.R.S. in 2 Volumes, Cambridge, MA, Harvard University Press; London, William Heinemann Ltd. 1921. . Online version at the Perseus Digital Library. Greek text available from the same website.
Apollonius Rhodius, Argonautica translated by Robert Cooper Seaton (1853-1915), R. C. Loeb Classical Library Volume 001. London, William Heinemann Ltd, 1912. Online version at the Topos Text Project.
 Apollonius Rhodius, Argonautica. George W. Mooney. London. Longmans, Green. 1912. Greek text available at the Perseus Digital Library.
 Bartelink, Dr. G.J.M. (1988). Prisma van de mythologie. Utrecht: Het Spectrum.
Dictys Cretensis, from The Trojan War. The Chronicles of Dictys of Crete and Dares the Phrygian translated by Richard McIlwaine Frazer, Jr. (1931-). Indiana University Press. 1966. Online version at the Topos Text Project.
 Dionysus of Halicarnassus, Roman Antiquities. English translation by Earnest Cary in the Loeb Classical Library, 7 volumes. Harvard University Press, 1937-1950. Online version at Bill Thayer's Web Site
 Dionysius of Halicarnassus, Antiquitatum Romanarum quae supersunt, Vol I-IV. . Karl Jacoby. In Aedibus B.G. Teubneri. Leipzig. 1885. Greek text available at the Perseus Digital Library.
 Gaius Julius Hyginus, Fabulae from The Myths of Hyginus translated and edited by Mary Grant. University of Kansas Publications in Humanistic Studies. Online version at the Topos Text Project.
 Gantz, Timothy, Early Greek Myth: A Guide to Literary and Artistic Sources, Johns Hopkins University Press, 1996, Two volumes:  (Vol. 1),  (Vol. 2).
Hard, Robin, The Routledge Handbook of Greek Mythology: Based on H.J. Rose's "Handbook of Greek Mythology", Psychology Press, 2004, . Google Books.
Hesiod, Theogony from The Homeric Hymns and Homerica with an English Translation by Hugh G. Evelyn-White, Cambridge, MA., Harvard University Press; London, William Heinemann Ltd. 1914. Online version at the Perseus Digital Library. Greek text available from the same website.
 Homer, The Iliad with an English Translation by A.T. Murray, Ph.D. in two volumes. Cambridge, MA., Harvard University Press; London, William Heinemann, Ltd. 1924. . Online version at the Perseus Digital Library.
 Homer, Homeri Opera in five volumes. Oxford, Oxford University Press. 1920. . Greek text available at the Perseus Digital Library.
Homer, The Odyssey with an English Translation by A.T. Murray, PH.D. in two volumes. Cambridge, MA., Harvard University Press; London, William Heinemann, Ltd. 1919. . Online version at the Perseus Digital Library. Greek text available from the same website.
 Kerényi, Carl, The Gods of the Greeks, Thames and Hudson, London, 1951. Internet Archive.
Maurus Servius Honoratus, In Vergilii carmina comentarii. Servii Grammatici qui feruntur in Vergilii carmina commentarii; recensuerunt Georgius Thilo et Hermannus Hagen. Georgius Thilo. Leipzig. B. G. Teubner. 1881. Online version at the Perseus Digital Library.
 Pausanias, Description of Greece with an English Translation by W.H.S. Jones, Litt.D., and H.A. Ormerod, M.A., in 4 Volumes. Cambridge, MA, Harvard University Press; London, William Heinemann Ltd. 1918. . Online version at the Perseus Digital Library
 Pausanias, Graeciae Descriptio. 3 vols. Leipzig, Teubner. 1903.  Greek text available at the Perseus Digital Library.
 Publius Ovidius Naso, The Epistles of Ovid. London. J. Nunn, Great-Queen-Street; R. Priestly, 143, High-Holborn; R. Lea, Greek-Street, Soho; and J. Rodwell, New-Bond-Street. 1813. Online version at the Perseus Digital Library.
Publius Ovidius Naso, Metamorphoses translated by Brookes More (1859-1942). Boston, Cornhill Publishing Co. 1922. Online version at the Perseus Digital Library.
 Publius Ovidius Naso, Metamorphoses. Hugo Magnus. Gotha (Germany). Friedr. Andr. Perthes. 1892. Latin text available at the Perseus Digital Library.
 Publius Vergilius Maro, Bucolics, Aeneid, and Georgics of Vergil. J. B. Greenough. Boston. Ginn & Co. 1900. Online version at the Perseus Digital Library.
 Strabo, The Geography of Strabo. Edition by H.L. Jones. Cambridge, Mass.: Harvard University Press; London: William Heinemann, Ltd. 1924. Online version at the Perseus Digital Library.
 Strabo, Geographica edited by A. Meineke. Leipzig: Teubner. 1877. Greek text available at the Perseus Digital Library.

Oceanids
Nereids
Deities in the Iliad
Women of the Trojan war
Princesses in Greek mythology
Metamorphoses characters
Cretan characters in Greek mythology
Minyan characters in Greek mythology
Thessalian mythology